Sagamore Conference is an eight-member IHSAA sanctioned athletic conference comprising 2A, 3A and 4A sized schools in Clinton, Boone, Hendricks, and Montgomery Counties in Central Indiana.

Membership

Former Members

Membership Timeline

Conference Championships

Football

Boys Basketball

Girls Basketball

State Championships

Crawfordsville (7)
1911 Boys Basketball
1919 Boys Track
1954 Boys Golf
1956 Boys Golf
1975 Girls Tennis
2008 Baseball (3A)
2011 Baseball (3A)

Frankfort (4)
1925 Boys Basketball
1929 Boys Basketball
1936 Boys Basketball
1939 Boys Basketball

Lebanon (4)
1912 Boys Basketball
1917 Boys Basketball
1918 Boys Basketball
2016 Softball (3A)

North Montgomery (2)
1995 Football (2A)
1996 Football (2A)

Tri-West Hendricks (5)
1996 Football (A)
2003 Football (2A)
2004 Football (2A)
2013 Softball (3A)
2014 Football (3A)

Western Boone (4)
1988 Football (2A)
2018 Football (2A)
2019 Football (2A)
2020 Football (2A)

External links 
 Sagamore Conference website
 IHSAA Conferences
 IHSAA Directory
 Sagamore Conference Handbook

Indiana high school athletic conferences
High school sports conferences and leagues in the United States